Stenaelurillus siyamae is a jumping spider species in the genus Stenaelurillus that lives in Sudan. The female was first described in 2018.

References

Salticidae
Spiders described in 2018
Spiders of Africa